Annyalla or Annayalla is a small village and townland situated in the east of County Monaghan in Ireland between Castleblayney and Clontibret. Annyalla townland is part of the civil parish of Clontibret.

The main feature of the village is St Michael's church, built between 1922 and 1927. It was designed by the architect William A Scott and completed under the supervision of R M Butler of University College Dublin.

The Monaghan Gaelic Athletic Association Training & Development Centre, is located nearby at Cloghan. Since November 2007 the village has been by-passed by the Castleblayney to Clontibret by-pass.

Annayalla was designated as a census town by the Central Statistics Office for the first time in the 2016 census, at which time it had a population of 228 people.

References

Townlands of County Monaghan
Towns and villages in County Monaghan